Anthony Alan Goodgame (born February 19, 1946) is an English former professional footballer who played in the Football League as a left back. He was born in Hammersmith, Greater London.

References

1946 births
Living people
Footballers from Hammersmith
English footballers
Association football defenders
Fulham F.C. players
Leyton Orient F.C. players
Hillingdon Borough F.C. players
English Football League players